Dasti is a Baloch tribe found in Punjab, Pakistan and Sindh. It may also refer to:

Dasti, Iran
Abdul Hamid Khan Dasti, politician
Jamshed Dasti, politician